Senator Ginn may refer to:

David 'Bo' Ginn (born 1951), Louisiana State Senate
Frank Ginn (born 1962), Georgia State Senate